The Lovat Cup is a trophy in the sport of shinty contested annually at New Year by Beauly Shinty Club and Lovat Shinty Club.

The trophy was first played for in 1904 and is very popular , attracting the second largest crowd  for a shinty fixture in Scotland, outwith the Camanachd Cup Final.  The fixture alternates annually between Balgate, Kiltarlity and Braeview Park, Beauly.  The two clubs' strong rivalry contributes to an entertaining game.  This rivalry was once described as so keen that "a cold stream ran between them".

Lovat retained the title in 2009. The 2010 fixture was cancelled due to heavy snow.  The rules of the competition mean that the competition cannot be rescheduled and so Lovat again retained the trophy. Lovat historically has a win ratio of two-to-one in the series.

Under the competition's rules, the need for a draw to retain the cup means that matters are settled in the regulation 90 minutes without the need for extra-time or penalties. This was the case with the 2011 fixture, where a 2-2 draw saw Lovat retain the cup.

Beauly regained the cup in 2015 but Lovat won in 2016 on home soil. Lovat won the next 3 years in a row, all away from home with the 2018 tie being reversed due to a frozen pitch in Kiltarlity, Greg Matheson scoring all 4 in a 4-0 win, in 2019 Lovat won 3-1 without the aid of Matheson who was injured to extend the period of dominance over their lower league rivals.

Results

References

External links
 Images from the 2007 fixture on Youtube
 Lovat Win in 2009
 
 2010 Lovat Cup cancelled

Shinty competitions